The Scottish Primary Teachers' Association (SPTA) was a Scottish teachers' union founded in August 2011. It was dissolved in September 2012.

See also

Education in Scotland

References

External links
Official website

2011 establishments in Scotland
Education trade unions
Educational organisations based in Scotland
Education International
Defunct trade unions of Scotland
Organisations based in Stirling (council area)
Trade unions established in 2011
Teacher associations based in the United Kingdom
Primary education
Trade unions disestablished in 2012